Xiuhtomiyauhtzin was a Queen consort of Tlatelolco.

Family
She was born as a princess, the daughter of the king Acolmiztli.

She married the king Tlacateotl. She was a mother of the king Tezozomoctli and Queen Izquixotzin and sister of queen Acxocueitl.

References

Nahua nobility
Year of birth missing
Year of death missing
Indigenous Mexican women
Nobility of the Americas